Isabella Novaes Menin (born June 2, 1996) is a Brazilian model and beauty queen who was crowned Miss Grand International 2022. She is the first Brazilian woman to win the Miss Grand International pageant.

Personal life
Isabella Menin is of Brazilian and Italian descent, and was born into a family of businessperson in Marília, a city in the midwestern region of the state of São Paulo. Her mother, Adriana Novaes, is a former Miss Marília winner and a candidate in many international contests. She is also the great-granddaughter of businessman, Lazaro Ramos Novaes, and granddaughter of Alfredo Novaes, two of the biggest names in the early industrialization of Marília.

During 2015 – 2016, she studied business and managerial economics program at a sixth form private school, David Game College, graduated first-class honors in a Bachelor degree of Economincs from University of Westminster in early 2019 and earned a master's degree in Finance from University College London in 2020. Before entering Miss Grand Brazil pageant in 2022, she worked as an international model and a paraplanner for Thomson Tyndall, a financial planning and investment management private firm in the United Kingdom.

Isabella also established a charitable organization named "Beyond Project", which supports associations for people with disabilities in Brazil.

Pageantry
Since she grew up in a family that was usually involved in beauty pageants, her mother, grandmother, and great-grandmother had all previously won beauty pageants; she entered a beauty pageant at the age of three with the encouragement and support of her mother and has won several mini-miss titles,  including Miss Goiás, Miss Student of Marilia, Miss Teen Marilia, and Miss Teen São Paulo, as well as the international title Miss Teen International in 2013.

Miss Grand International 2022

Menin represented Alto Cafezal at Miss Grand Brazil 2022, competed against 30 other candidates, and won the national title. She then represented the country in Miss Grand International 2022 and also won the competition, held on October 25, 2022, at Sentul International Convention Center in West Java, Indonesia, when she was crowned by outgoing titleholder Miss Grand International 2021, Nguyễn Thúc Thùy Tiên of Vietnam. She is the first titleholder from Brazil as Miss Grand International. She is also the first titleholder from Brazil to win a major international beauty pageant since Larissa Ramos that was the last Brazilian competitor who won Miss Earth 2009.

During the top ten speech round, in which all ten qualified competitors had to present a message to accompany the pageant campaign "Stop the wars and violence," Menin declared:

The last stage was a question-answer round, with the host posing the same question to all top five finalists, "Currently there is a war between Russia and Ukraine. Russia’s president has ordered an invasion of Ukraine, killing people, destroying architecture, and create uncertainties in the future. If you have the opportunity to send a message to President Putin, what will you say in 1 minute?" Menin replied:

References

External links

 

1996 births
Living people
Alumni of the University of Westminster
Alumni of University College London
Brazilian beauty pageant winners
Brazilian female models
Brazilian people of Italian descent
Miss Grand International winners
People from São Paulo